Camo is a freemium webcam app by British software company Reincubate allowing phones and other mobile devices to be used as webcams and document cameras.

The app runs on macOS and Microsoft Windows and is compatible with iOS and Android phones.

The app comes in a free and Pro version. The free version uses the mobile device’s main camera, while the Pro version gives accesses to all cameras.

Using Camo requires downloading an app to the mobile device and a counterpart app, Camo Studio.

References

External links
 

Webcams
Video recording software
Livestreaming software
Streaming software
Cross-platform software
Freemium
Proprietary cross-platform software
Windows multimedia software
MacOS multimedia software
Windows software
MacOS software
IOS software